Vatta is a village in , Hungary.

Etymology
According to local tradition, the name of Vatta from the name of an 11th-century pagan tribal chief called "Vata".

History
The first known record of the village is in a charter of 1323. In the following centuries it was known as Vatha, Woytha, Watha, and Bata. These combined later.

During the Ottoman rule of the 16th century, the village was razed and the inhabitants had to flee several times.

In 1895 Vatta became a town, and from 1950 an independent village. After Communist rule, in 1990 the village got its own parish council.

Landmarks
 Odescalch Castle, built in the 18th century.
 Roman Catholic church, built in the 18th century in the Baroque style, dedicated to Saint Mary the Virgin.
 Reform Church.
 Monument of Heros, by János Pásztor, erected in 1926.

Notable people
Bertalan Szemere, the second prime minister of Hungary, was born in Vatta on 27 August 1812.

References

External links 
 Street map 

Populated places in Borsod-Abaúj-Zemplén County